The Red Lion Inn in Stockbridge, Massachusetts is one of the Historic Hotels of America of the National Trust for Historic Preservation.

History
Legend claims that the Red Lion first operated as a tavern in 1773. After operating for over 100 years, the inn was destroyed by fire in 1896.  Rebuilt the following year, the inn was owned by the same family until 1968, when under threat of being razed, it was purchased by the current owners. The main building of the inn offers 82 guest rooms.  In addition to the inn itself, the hotel operates nearby guest houses and other properties as alternative lodging options.

Famous guests of the inn include presidents Grover Cleveland, William McKinley, Theodore Roosevelt, Calvin Coolidge, and Franklin Delano Roosevelt as well as noted authors Nathaniel Hawthorne, Henry Wadsworth Longfellow, and Thorton Wilder.

The inn was included in Norman Rockwell’s 1967 painting, Stockbridge Main Street at Christmas (Home for Christmas).

References

1773 establishments in Massachusetts
National Register of Historic Places in Berkshire County, Massachusetts
Historic Hotels of America